This is a list of airlines currently operating in Estonia.

Charter airlines

Cargo airlines

See also
 List of airlines
 List of defunct airlines of Estonia
 List of defunct airlines of Europe

References

Airlines

Estonia
Airlines
Estonia